Romina Ressia (born March 11, 1981) is a multi-award-winning photographer and artist from Buenos Aires, Argentina.  She is recognized for pioneering the use of anachronisms applied to images of strong Renaissance influence combined with contemporary objects.  Which are incorporated into her scenes of complete classical aesthetics, generating a break with respect to the great masters’ paintings.  Among her most iconic works are objects such as popcorn, chewing gum, hamburgers, sodas, a spaghetti, dental accessories, among others. Her works have been featured by The Huffington Post, Interview, Vanity Fair, Vogue Italia and The Wild Magazine, among others.

Life and career
Ressia was born on March 11, 1981, in Azul, Buenos Aires, Argentina. At the age of 19 she moved to Capital Federal to study, where she graduated as an accountant with a Bachelor of Business Administration at the University of Buenos Aires. She later quit accounting to devote herself to photography, which she studied along with art direction and scenery at the Teatro Colon.

She started in fashion photography but transitioned to fine arts, venturing beyond photography into mixed media.

It was fast that the artist gained popularity in the Art world. In 2017, The Women’s Forum for the Economy and Society selected her as one of the seventeen young women who are in their way to become the most influential figures of the world.
Her works have been largely exhibited in London, Edinburgh, Buenos Aires, Cordoba, Barcelona, Norway, Paris, Zurich, Milan, New York, Los Angeles, Brussels, among other cities.

Selected works
Pop-Corn  and Double Bubblegum, from the series How Would Have Been, Argentina, 2013). This piece is part of the permanent collection of Columbus Museum of Art.
Venus series
18th Century series
Ladies series
Not about death series
What Do You Hide series 
Renaissance Cubism series
Not About Death series
 The modern world through classic eyes Paris, 2014. Publisher: Yellow Korner. First Edition of 1,000 copies.

Production of the artist
The artist is characterized by the use of anachronisms and juxtapositions that allow to draw a timeline from which to explore human evolution and their behavior as individuals and as a collective. Ressia, along with other artists such as Hendrik Kerstens, despite the differences in their approach, have paved the way for many other image’s creators who choose to bring the past into the present by incorporating current objects into scenes from past centuries.

Gallery representation

 HOFA Gallery - London and Mykonos
 Arusha Gallery - UK
 Samuel Marthaler Gallery - Belgium
 Laurent Marthaler Contemporary - Switzerland
 Leica Gallery - Brazil

References

External links 
 Ressia's official website

1981 births
Living people
Artists from Buenos Aires
20th-century Argentine women artists
21st-century Argentine women artists
Portrait photographers
Argentine women photographers
University of Buenos Aires alumni
Women conceptual artists
21st-century women photographers